{{Infobox sports rivalry
 | name                     = Broncos–Chiefs rivalry
 | team1                     = Denver Broncos
 | team2                     = Kansas City Chiefs
 | team1logo                     = Denver Broncos wordmark.svg
 | team2logo                     = Kansas City Chiefs wordmark.svg
 | first contested                     = October 30, 1960Texans 17, Broncos 14
 | mostrecent                     = January 1, 2023Chiefs 27, Broncos 24
 | nextmeeting                     = 2023
 | total                     = 125 (including playoffs)
 | largestvictory                     = Broncos: 38–3;Chiefs: 59–7
 | smallestvictory                     = 1 point (occurred 6 times, four by the Broncos — most recently , two by the Chiefs — most recently )
 | currentstreak                     = Chiefs: 15 wins (2015–present)
 | longeststreak                     = Broncos: 8 (1976-1979)  Chiefs: 15 (2015–present)
 | series                     = Chiefs, 71–55 (including playoffs)
 | postseason                     = Broncos, 1–0

 | section_header                     = Playoff and Championship success
 | section_info                     = AFL Championships (3) 
 Chiefs – 1962, 1966, 1969

Super Bowl Championships (6)
 Broncos (3) –  (XXXII),  (XXXIII),  (50)
 Chiefs (3) – 1969 (IV),  (LIV),  (LVII)

AFL Western Division Championships (2) Chiefs – 1962, 1966AFC West Divisional Championships (28) 
 Chiefs (5) – 1966, 1969, 
}}
The Broncos–Chiefs rivalry is a rivalry between the Denver Broncos and Kansas City Chiefs in the National Football League's AFC West division. Since the American Football League was established in 1960, the Broncos and the Chiefs have shared the same division, first being the AFL Western Conference, and since the AFL–NFL merger, the AFC West. For years, the rivalry has featured two of the best home-field advantages in the league. CBS ranked this rivalry as the No. 4 NFL rivalry of the 1990s in 2020.

The Dallas Texans/Chiefs dominated the Broncos in the 1960s, the decade of the AFL, winning 19 of 20 games. The Broncos have responded since then, winning the series from the 1970s to 2000s. The Chiefs snapped this streak in the 2010s when they won 11–9. The Chiefs/Texans lead the series 71–55, but since the Texans moved to Kansas City and became the Chiefs, they lead 64–55. Dallas swept all six meetings in the rivalry's first three years.  

In the 2010s, Peyton Manning went 7–1 against the Chiefs as a member of the Broncos from 2012–2015, but since November 15, 2015, the Chiefs have a 15-game winning streak over Denver. After Manning retired following the 2015 season, the Chiefs have gone 14–0 against the Broncos, and Chiefs QB Patrick Mahomes has a perfect 11–0 record against Denver. Combined, the two teams have won the last 12 AFC West Division titles from 2010–2022, and were the only teams to win the AFC West in the 2010s.

Notable moments

1990–1994September 17, 1990: In a game played at Mile High Stadium on Monday Night Football, the Broncos were trailing 23–21 with 1:44 left in the fourth quarter, after Chiefs' quarterback Steve DeBerg launched an 83-yard touchdown pass to wide receiver Stephone Paige to give the Chiefs their first lead of the game. Broncos' quarterback John Elway engineered a comeback, which culminated with kicker David Treadwell hitting a 22-yard field goal as time expired. The game is also remembered for Broncos' safety Steve Atwater applying a punishing hit to Chiefs' running back Christian Okoye.
 October 4, 1992: The Chiefs were victimized by 8 of John Elway's 46 fourth quarter comebacks/game-winning drives, the most he had against one NFL team. Perhaps the most memorable comeback occurred on October 4, 1992, at Mile High Stadium. The Broncos trailed 19–6 late in the fourth quarter, and had not scored a touchdown in the previous 12 quarters. After the 2-minute warning, Elway threw a 25-yard touchdown pass to wide receiver Mark Jackson to narrow the gap to 19–13 with 1:55 left. After the Chiefs subsequently went three-and-out, the Broncos returned a punt to the Chiefs' 27-yard line. Three plays later, Elway threw a 12-yard touchdown pass to wide receiver Vance Johnson with 38 seconds left for a thrilling 20–19 comeback win.
 December 27, 1992: Less than three months after John Elway stunned the Chiefs with the aforementioned comeback win, the Chiefs exacted revenge on the Broncos at Arrowhead Stadium in the  regular season finale, with a playoff berth on the line. The Chiefs routed the Broncos 42–20, with the Chiefs' defense scoring three touchdowns off Broncos' turnovers, and denying the Broncos a playoff berth in the process.
 October 17, 1994: John Elway and Joe Montana, two of the greatest quarterbacks in NFL history, squared off in one of the greatest games in Monday Night Football history. Montana played the last two years of his 16-year NFL career with the Chiefs (1993–94), after playing the majority of his career with the San Francisco 49ers (1979–1992). The two teams matched each other score for score through the first three quarters, until Chiefs' kicker Lin Elliott nailed a 19-yard field goal to give the Chiefs a 24–21 lead with four minutes remaining in the fourth quarter. After Broncos' tight end Shannon Sharpe and Chiefs' running back Marcus Allen traded fumbles over the next two possessions, Elway led the Broncos on a 6-play, 39-yard drive, and scored a 4-yard touchdown on a quarterback draw to give the Broncos a 28–24 lead with 1:29 remaining. However, the Chiefs would one-up the Broncos, with Montana connecting on a 5-yard touchdown pass to wide receiver Willie Davis with only eight seconds remaining to give the Chiefs a thrilling 31–28 win. It not only gave Chiefs' head coach Marty Schottenheimer his first victory in Denver in eight tries, but the Chiefs also snapped an 11-game losing streak at Mile High Stadium.
 December 4, 1994: In a game at Arrowhead Stadium, Broncos' defensive end Shane Dronett blocked a potential game-winning 37-yard field goal by Chiefs' placekicker Lin Elliott at the end of regulation, sending the game to overtime. Broncos' quarterback Hugh Millen, substituting for an injured John Elway, committed a fumble in Broncos' territory after being sacked by Chiefs' defensive end Darren Mickell; however, the Chiefs immediately returned the favor when running back Marcus Allen lost a fumble that was recovered by safety Dennis Smith at the Broncos' 27-yard line. Placekicker Jason Elam later kicked a 34-yard field goal with 2:48 remaining in overtime, for a Broncos' 20–17 victory.

1997–present
 November 16, 1997: The Broncos were trailing the Chiefs 21–19 at Arrowhead Stadium, and were backed up at their own 27-yard line with two minutes remaining in the fourth quarter. Quarterback John Elway led the Broncos down the field, with Jason Elam kicking a 34-yard field goal with only a minute left to give the Broncos a 22–21 lead. However, Chiefs' quarterback Rich Gannon drove the Chiefs to the Broncos' 37-yard line, and kicker Pete Stoyanovich hit a 54-yard field goal as time expired to give the Chiefs a 24–22 win.
 January 4, 1998: A very hard-fought, yet controversial game. Less than two months after the aforementioned last-second win by the Chiefs, the Broncos returned to Kansas City for the divisional round of the 1997–98 NFL playoffs, and redeemed themselves by upending the No. 1 seed Chiefs 14–10, en route to their first Super Bowl win that season. It has been a win shrouded in controversy as the referees wrongfully called Tony Gonzalez out of bounds on one of his touchdowns and Broncos lineman and Terrell Davis coating themselves with Vaseline in the first half.
 October 5, 2003: Chiefs' return specialist Dante Hall returned a punt 93 yards for a touchdown in the fourth quarter, after it seemed that the Broncos' special teams had him corralled for a loss deep in Chiefs' territory. This gave the Chiefs a 24–23 win over the Broncos at Arrowhead Stadium.
 November 14, 2010: The Broncos stormed out to a 35–0 lead against the visiting Chiefs before the second half, leading to a 49–29 victory. Chiefs' head coach Todd Haley was distraught after the game and snubbed a postgame handshake with Broncos' head coach Josh McDaniels, thinking that the Broncos were running up the score on the Chiefs.
 September 17, 2015: The Broncos trailed 24–17 at Arrowhead Stadium with 2:27 left, when quarterback Peyton Manning engineered a 10-play, 80-yard drive, culminating in a game-tying 19-yard touchdown pass to wide receiver Emmanuel Sanders with 36 seconds left. The game appeared to be headed to overtime, until Broncos' linebacker Brandon Marshall forced Chiefs' running back Jamaal Charles to fumble on the next play from scrimmage. Cornerback Bradley Roby then returned the fumble 21 yards for a touchdown to give the Broncos a stunning 31–24 comeback win. This is Denver's last win over Kansas City to date.
 November 15, 2015: Two months after the aforementioned Broncos' comeback win, the Chiefs exacted revenge in a dominating 29–13 win at Sports Authority Field at Mile High and ended a seven-game losing steak to the Broncos. Despite the anticipation of Peyton Manning becoming the NFL's all-time leader in regular season passing yardage, needing only three yards to do so, the Chiefs' defense held Manning to just 35 yards passing and intercepted him four times, giving him the only 0.0 passer rating of his career before being benched in the third quarter in favor of backup quarterback Brock Osweiler. Shortly after the game, it was revealed that Manning had been dealing with plantar fasciitis, which kept him out until Week 17. The game would prove to be the final regular season start of Manning's career as would be the backup for the Broncos once he came back from injury. Despite this loss and Manning's injury, however, the Broncos would eventually go onto win Super Bowl 50, but not have made the playoffs since then as Manning retired following the season.
 November 27, 2016: The Chiefs were trailing 24–16 with three minutes left in regulation, when quarterback Alex Smith engineered a 13-play, 75-yard drive, culminating in a 3-yard touchdown pass to wide receiver Tyreek Hill, coupled with a game-tying two-point conversion with only 12 seconds remaining, sending the game to overtime. Hill previously returned a free kick 86 yards for a touchdown in the second quarter and also scored on a 3-yard touchdown run in the third quarter. After each team exchanged field goals in overtime — a 44-yarder by Broncos' placekicker Brandon McManus followed by a 37-yarder by Chiefs' placekicker Cairo Santos, the Broncos were trying to win the game with a highly criticized 62-yard field goal attempt by McManus, but the kick was both short and wide-left, giving the Chiefs possession at the Broncos' 48-yard line with 1:08 remaining. Four plays later, and with five seconds remaining, Santos kicked the game-winning 34-yard field goal for the Chiefs, which initially caromed off the left upright.
 October 1, 2018: On Monday Night Football in Denver, the Chiefs trailed 23–13 in the fourth quarter before Patrick Mahomes found Travis Kelce for a 2-yard score. The defense then held the Broncos to a three-and-out, giving the ball back to Mahomes, who led the team down the field, even avoiding a sack by Von Miller to throw the ball left-handed to Tyreek Hill for a first down. Kareem Hunt then scored the game-winning touchdown on a 4-yard rush with 1:39 remaining, giving Kansas City its fourth consecutive victory at Broncos Stadium at Mile High.
 January 8, 2022: In the 2021 regular season finale in Denver, the Broncos were holding a 21–20 lead midway through the fourth quarter, hoping to end a 12-game losing streak to the Chiefs. The Broncos were attempting to add to their lead, and marched deep into Chiefs' territory, when Chiefs' linebacker Melvin Ingram penetrated into the Broncos' backfield untouched, and forced a fumble off of Gordon. Linebacker Nick Bolton scooped up the football, and returned the fumble 86 yards for a game-changing touchdown and a 28–24 Chiefs' win.

Season-by-season results

|-
| 1960
| style="| | style="| Texans  17–14| style="| Texans  34–7| Texans  2–0
| Inaugural season for both franchises and the AFL.  
|-
| 1961
| style="| | style="| Texans  19–12| style="| Texans  49–21| Texans  4–0
| 
|-
| 1962
| style="| | style="| Texans  24–3| style="| Texans  17–10| Texans  6–0
| Chiefs win 1962 AFL Championship.
|-
| 1963
| style="| | style="| Chiefs  59–7| style="| Chiefs  52–21| Chiefs  8–0
| To date, 59–7 is the Broncos' most lopsided margin of defeat in franchise history; the Dallas Texans relocate to Kansas City and become the Kansas City Chiefs.
|-
| 1964
| Tie 1–1| style="| Broncos  33–27| style="| Chiefs  49–39| Chiefs  9–1
| The Broncos' only victory over the Chiefs during the AFL era.
|-
| 1965
| style="| | style="| Chiefs  31–23| style="| Chiefs  45–35| Chiefs  11–1
| 
|-
| 1966
| style="| | style="| Chiefs  56–10| style="| Chiefs  37–10| Chiefs  13–1
| Chiefs win 1966 AFL Championship, lose Super Bowl I.
|-
| 1967
| style="| | style="| Chiefs  38–24| style="| Chiefs  52–9| Chiefs  15–1
| 
|-
| 1968
| style="| | style="| Chiefs  30–7| style="| Chiefs  34–2| Chiefs  17–1
| 
|-
| 1969
| style="| | style="| Chiefs  26–13| style="| Chiefs  31–17| Chiefs  19–1
| Chiefs win Super Bowl IV
|-

|-
| 
| Tie 1–1| style="| Broncos  26–13| style="| Chiefs  16–0| Chiefs  20–2
| AFL–NFL merger; both teams placed in the AFC West.
|-
| 
| style="| | style="| Chiefs  16–3| style="| Chiefs  28–10| Chiefs  22–2
| Chiefs finish 9-0 against Broncos in Municipal Stadium.
|-
| 
| style="| | style="| Chiefs  45–24| style="| Chiefs  24–21| Chiefs  24–2
| Chiefs' first season at Arrowhead Stadium.
|-
| 
| Tie 1–1| style="| Broncos  14–10| style="| Chiefs  16–14| Chiefs  25–3
| Chiefs win 25 of the first 27 meetings.
|-
| 
| Tie 1–1| style="| Chiefs  42–34| style="| Broncos  17–14| Chiefs  26–4
| Broncos' first road win over the Chiefs.
|-
| 
| Tie 1–1| style="| Broncos  37–33| style="| Chiefs  26–13| Chiefs  27–5
| 
|-
| 
| style="| | style="| Broncos  17–16| style="| Broncos  35–26| Chiefs  27–7
| Broncos' first season sweep over the Chiefs.
|-
| 
| style="| | style="| Broncos  23–7| style="| Broncos  14–7| Chiefs  27–9
| Broncos' first ever postseason berth; Broncos lose Super Bowl XII.
|-
| 
| style="| | style="| Broncos  24–3| style="| Broncos  23–17 | Chiefs  27–11
| 
|-
| 
| style="| | style="| Broncos  20–3| style="| Broncos  24–10| Chiefs  27–13
| Broncos win eight consecutive meetings from 1976 to 1979.
|-

|-
| 
| style="| | style="| Chiefs  23–17| style="| Chiefs  31–14| Chiefs  29–13
| 
|-
| 
| Tie 1–1| style="| Broncos  16–13| style="| Chiefs  28–14| Chiefs  30–14
| 
|-
| 
| style="| | style="| Chiefs  37–16|
| Chiefs  31–14
| The two teams met only once (at Denver) due to the players strike which reduced the season to 9 games.
|-
| 
| Tie 1–1| style="| Broncos  27–24| style="| Chiefs  48–17| Chiefs  32–15
| 
|-
| 
| Tie 1–1| style="| Broncos  21–0| style="| Chiefs  16–13| Chiefs  33–16
| 
|-
| 
| style="| | style="| Broncos  14–13| style="| Broncos  30–10| Chiefs  33–18
| 
|-
| 
| Tie 1–1| style="| Broncos  38–17| style="| Chiefs  37–10| Chiefs  34–19
| Broncos lose Super Bowl XXI.
|-
| 
| style="| | style="| Broncos  20–17| style="| Broncos  26–17| | Chiefs  34–21
| Broncos lose Super Bowl XXII.
|-
| 
| Tie 1–1| style="| Broncos  17–11| style="| Chiefs  20–13| Chiefs  35–22
| 
|-
| 
| style="| | style="| Broncos  34–20| style="| Broncos  16–13| Chiefs  35–24
| Broncos lose Super Bowl XXIV.
|-

|-
| 
| Tie 1–1| style="| Broncos  24–23| style="| Chiefs  31–20| Chiefs  36–25
| David Treadwell kicks game-winning 22-yard field goal in the last seconds of the game in Denver.
|-
| 
| style="| | style="| Broncos  19–16| style="| Broncos  24–20| Chiefs  36–27
| 
|-
| 
| Tie 1–1| style="| Broncos  20–19| style="| Chiefs  42–20| Chiefs  37–28
| John Elway stuns the Chiefs with a fourth quarter comeback at Denver; Chiefs exact revenge by denying the Broncos a playoff berth at Kansas City.
|-
| 
| Tie 1–1| style="| Broncos  27–21| style="| Chiefs  15–7| Chiefs  38–29
| Broncos win 11 consecutive home meetings from 1983–93.
|-
| 
| Tie 1–1| style="| Chiefs  31–28| style="| Broncos  20–17 | Chiefs  39–30
| Joe Montana leads the Chiefs to a dramatic win at Denver; Broncos block potential game-winning field goal at Kansas City.
|-
| 
| style="| | style="| Chiefs  21–7| style="| Chiefs  20–17| Chiefs  41–30
| Chiefs' first series sweep since 1980.
|-
| 
| Tie 1–1| style="| Broncos  34–7| style="| Chiefs  17–14| Chiefs  42–31
|  
|-
| 
| Tie 1–1| style="| Broncos  19–3| style="| Chiefs  24–22| Chiefs  43–32
| Pete Stoyanovich kicks a game-winning 54-yard field goal at Kansas City; Broncos win Super Bowl XXXII.
|- style="background:#f2f2f2; font-weight:bold;"
|  1997 Playoffs
| style="| 
| 
| style="| Broncos  14–10
|  Chiefs  43–33
|  AFC Divisional playoffs. Only playoff meeting between the two teams.
|-
| 
| style="| | style="| Broncos  35–31| style="| Broncos  30–7| Chiefs  43–35
| Broncos win Super Bowl XXXIII.
|-
| 
| style="| | style="| Chiefs  16–10| style="| Chiefs  26–10| Chiefs  45–35
| 
|-

|-
| 
| style="| | style="| Chiefs  23–22| style="| Chiefs  20–7| Chiefs  47–35
| 
|-
| 
| Tie 1–1| style="| Broncos  20–6| style="| Chiefs  26–23 | Chiefs  48–36
| Broncos open Broncos Stadium at Mile High (known then as "Invesco Field at Mile High").
|-
| 
| style="| | style="| Broncos  31–24| style="| Broncos  37–34 | Chiefs  48–38
| 
|-
| 
| Tie 1–1| style="| Broncos  45–27| style="| Chiefs  24–23| Chiefs  49–39
| Dante Hall returns a punt 93 yards for a touchdown in the fourth quarter at Kansas City.
|-
| 
| Tie 1–1| style="| Broncos  34–24| style="| Chiefs  45–17| Chiefs  50–40
| 
|-
| 
| Tie 1–1| style="| Broncos  30–10| style="| Chiefs  31–27| Chiefs  51–41
|
|-
| 
| Tie 1–1| style="| Broncos  9–6 | style="| Chiefs  19–10| Chiefs  52–42
| Game in Kansas City played on Thanksgiving Day. 
|-
| 
| style="| | style="| Broncos  41–7| style="| Broncos  27–11| Chiefs  52–44 
| 
|-
| 
| Tie 1–1| style="| Broncos  24–17| style="| Chiefs  33–19| Chiefs  53–45
| Broncos win eight consecutive home meetings from 2001 to 2008.
|-
| 
| Tie 1–1| style="| Chiefs  44–24| style="| Broncos  44–13| Chiefs  54–46
| 
|-

|-
| 
| Tie 1–1| style="| Broncos  49–29| style="| Chiefs  10–6| Chiefs  55–47
| Infamous post-game handshake snub between the head coaches at Denver — Josh McDaniels (Broncos) and Todd Haley (Chiefs).
|-
| 
| Tie 1–1| style="| Chiefs  7–3| style="| Broncos  17–10| Chiefs  56–48 
| 
|-
| 
| style="| | style="| Broncos  38–3| style="| Broncos  17–9| Chiefs  56–50
| 
|-
| 
| style="| | style="| Broncos  27–17| style="| Broncos  35–28| Chiefs  56–52
| Chiefs started 9–0 and the Broncos started 8–1 entering their week 11 meeting in Denver. Broncos lose Super Bowl XLVIII.
|-
| 
| style="| | style="| Broncos  24–17| style="| Broncos  29–16| Chiefs  56–54
|
|-
| 
| Tie 1–1| style="| Chiefs  29–13| style="| Broncos  31–24| Chiefs  57–55
| Peyton Manning leads Broncos to a fourth quarter comeback win at Kansas City; Broncos win seven consecutive meetings from 2012–15; Broncos win Super Bowl 50.
|-
| 
| style="| | style="| Chiefs  30–27 | style="| Chiefs  33–10| Chiefs  59–55
| Alex Smith leads the Chiefs to an overtime comeback win at Denver; Chiefs' first series sweep since 2000. Game in Kansas City played on Christmas, in which Kansas City eliminates Denver from playoff contention.
|-
| 
| style="| | style="| Chiefs  27–24| style="| Chiefs  29–19| Chiefs  61–55 
| Chiefs quarterback Patrick Mahomes gets his first ever start in the series in a Week 17 game in Denver.
|-
| 
| style="| | style="| Chiefs  27–23| style="| Chiefs  30–23| Chiefs  63–55
| 
|-
| 
| style="| | style="| Chiefs  30–6| style="| Chiefs  23–3| Chiefs  65–55
| This season, the Chiefs allowed the fewest points in season series since 1968. Chiefs win Super Bowl LIV.
|-

|-
| 
| style="| | style="| Chiefs  43–16| style="| Chiefs  22–16| Chiefs  67–55
| Chiefs lose Super Bowl LV.
|-
| 
| style="| | style="| Chiefs  28–24| style="| Chiefs  22–9| Chiefs  69–55
|
|-
| 
| style="| | style="| Chiefs  34–28 
| style="| Chiefs  27–24| Chiefs  71–55
| Chiefs have won 15 straight meetings (2015–present). Chiefs win Super Bowl LVII.
|- 

|-
| AFL regular season
| style="|Chiefs 19–1| Chiefs 9–1
| Chiefs 10–0
|
|-
| NFL regular season
| style="|Broncos 53–52| Broncos 34–19
| Chiefs 33–19
| 
|-
| AFL and NFL regular season
| style="|Chiefs 71–54| Broncos 35–28
| Chiefs 43–19
| 
|-
| NFL postseason
| style="|Broncos 1–0| No games
| Broncos 1–0
| 1997 AFC Divisional playoffs
|-
| Regular and postseason 
| style="|Chiefs 71–55'''
| Broncos 35–28
| Chiefs 43–20
| 
|-

Notes

References

External links
 Denver Broncos' official website
 The Denver Post – Complete Broncos Coverage
 Pro Football Hall of Fame – Denver Broncos team history
 Denver Broncos at Sports E-Cyclopedia.org
 Kansas City Chiefs' official website
 The Kansas City Star – Chiefs' coverage
 Pro Football Hall of Fame – Kansas City Chiefs team history
 Kansas City Chiefs at Sports E-Cyclopedia.org

Denver Broncos
Kansas City Chiefs
National Football League rivalries
Denver Broncos rivalries
Kansas City Chiefs rivalries